Dédé Wilson (born ) is an American baker and cookbook author.

Work
Wilson studied restaurant management at Hampshire College, graduating in 1979. She was a contributing editor in the food magazine Bon Appétit. She has hosted two CreateTV shows, Seasonings with Dédé Wilson and The Holiday Table, and appeared on The Today Show and The View. Her first cookbook, The Wedding Cake Book, was published in 1997, and nominated for an award from the International Association of Culinary Professionals.

Bakepedia
In 2011, Wilson had an idea for a website, and "Bakepedia", a site for original recipes and information about baking, was launched in 2013. It was intended as a leading online resource for bakers.

Books

Wilson is the author of several cookbooks, including A Baker's Field Guide to Christmas Cookies (2003), A Baker's Field Guide to Chocolate Chip Cookies (2004) and Wedding Cakes you Can Make (2005). She has also written books about Low-FODMAP diets, including The Low-FODMAP Diet Step by Step (2018, with Kate Scarlata).

Personal life
Wilson grew up in New York City and moved to Amherst, Massachusetts in 1979. She has 3 children.

References

External links
 
 Bakepedia, website founded by Wilson

Living people
Women cookbook writers
Hampshire College alumni
Writers from Massachusetts
Bon Appétit people
Year of birth missing (living people)